Çiçeksepeti, is an online floral and gourmet foods, gift retailer operating in Turkey.

Çiçeksepeti was founded in 2006 by Emre Aydın, a Turkish İnternet entrepreneur. Amazon.com invested in Çiçeksepeti in 2011., Çiçek Sepeti acquired major online florists 444çiçek.com on 2012, and Cicek.com on 2013. On 2014, a major gourmet food retailer, Bonnyfood, was acquired. Fashion and cosmetics retailer Mizu was founded on 2012.

Çiçeksepeti, was selected as Turkey country representative by Endeavor in 2010. On 2011, Founder&CEO Emre Aydın was selected as in London.

References

External links 
 www.ciceksepeti.com website
 
 
 Çiçeksepeti iletişim

Amazon (company)
Retail companies established in 2006
Internet properties established in 2006
Online retailers of Turkey
Companies based in Istanbul
Turkish brands
2006 establishments in Turkey